Lee Won-Woo (Hangul: 이원우, August 19, 1958 – May 24, 2004) was a South Korean basketball player.

He played as a shooting guard. He is 188 cm (6 ft 2 in) tall. He competed at the 1988 Seoul Olympic Games, where the South Korean team finished in ninth position.

His former teams include Hyundai Electronics, and he coached the national wheelchair basketball team at the 2002 FESPIC Games.

He died of a brain tumor in Seoul on May 24, 2004.

References

1958 births
2004 deaths
Asian Games bronze medalists for South Korea
Asian Games medalists in basketball
Asian Games silver medalists for South Korea
Basketball players at the 1986 Asian Games
Basketball players at the 1988 Summer Olympics
Basketball players at the 1990 Asian Games
Deaths from brain tumor
Jeonju KCC Egis players
Kyung Hee University alumni
Medalists at the 1986 Asian Games
Medalists at the 1990 Asian Games
Olympic basketball players of South Korea
Shooting guards
South Korean basketball coaches
South Korean men's basketball players
1990 FIBA World Championship players
1986 FIBA World Championship players